Maria Arielle Estrañero is a Filipino volleyball athlete player. She is a former player of the UP Lady Fighting Maroons in the UAAP in both indoor and beach volleyball.

Career
Estrañero studied her secondary education at University of St. La Salle in Bacolod. She was one of the players who represented Western Visayas in the Palarong Pambansa 2014 where she bagged the Best Attacker award. She chose to study at the University of the Philippines - Diliman for college taking up Communication Research.  She plays multiple positions for the UP Lady Fighting Maroons as a converted setter, converted libero, and as an attacker. Together with her teammate, Diana Mae Carlos, they brought home the bronze medal in the UAAP Season 80 Beach Volleyball Tournament.  In 2021, she signed up at Cignal HD Spikers after her team Motolite took a leave of absence in the league.

Awards
  UP Fighting Maroons Volleyball Team (2015-2019)
  Motolite Volleyball Team (2019-2021)
  Cignal HD Spikers (2021)

Individual
 2014 Palarong Pambansa "Best Attacker"

Collegiate
 Shakey's V-League 13th Season Collegiate Conference -  Bronze medal, with UP Fighting Lady Maroons 
 2016 Founders'  Cup Philippines -   Champion, with UP Fighting Lady Maroons
 2017 Founders'  Cup Philippines -   Champion, with UP Fighting Lady Maroons
 UAAP Season 80 Beach Volleyball -  Bronze medal, with UP Fighting Lady Maroons
 2018 Premier Volleyball League Collegiate Conference -   Champion, with UP Fighting Lady Maroons
 2018 PSL Collegiate Grand Slam Conference -   Champion, with UP Fighting Lady Maroons

References

1996 births
Living people
Filipino women's volleyball players
University of the Philippines Diliman alumni
University Athletic Association of the Philippines volleyball players
Setters (volleyball)
Sportspeople from Bacolod
21st-century Filipino women